The Rainforest Foundation UK (RFUK) is a non-profit NGO working in Africa and South America. It is one of the first international organizations to support the indigenous peoples of the world's rainforests in their efforts to protect their environment and fulfill their rights to land, life and livelihood. The Foundation aims to protect rainforests by securing the land rights of indigenous peoples and other forest-dependent communities. It also campaigns internationally on issues such as industrial logging, climate change, agricultural expansion and nature conservation.

It forms part of the Rainforest Foundation network, with independent sister organizations in the United States and the Norway: the Rainforest Foundation US and the Rainforest Foundation Norway.

History

The Rainforest Foundation was first founded in 1989 by Sting and his wife Trudie Styler after the indigenous leader of the Kayapo people of Brazil, the Chief Raoni made a personal request to them to help his community protect their lands and culture. The Rainforest Foundation's initial project was successful in coordinating the first ever privately funded demarcation of indigenous land in the region - 17,000 square miles of traditional land, the Menkragnoti area, next to Xingu National Park, was demarcated and legally titled to the Kayapo people by the Brazilian government in 1993.
Since then the Rainforest Foundation UK, along with its sister organizations the Rainforest Foundation US, The Rainforest Foundation Norway, and the Rainforest Foundation Fund, have protected millions of hectares of forest in 20 different rainforest countries around the globe.

Approach
The Rainforest Foundation UK promotes a rights-based approach to rainforest protection. Its approach is founded on the belief that the best way to protect rainforest ecosystems is through empowering indigenous peoples and other forest dwellers to defend their fundamental rights to lands and resources. Its primary work in the Congo Basin promotes land and resource rights through community-led mapping, as well as through legal and advocacy training.
In order to pursue its mission, RFUK works in cooperation with local organizations, indigenous groups, and traditional populations of the rainforest. It also seeks to “campaign to influence national and international laws to protect rainforests and their inhabitants”.

The organization has adopted an approach that emphasizes the strengthening of civil society as an important goal in the countries in which it is active. On this basis, it has prioritized building long-term partnerships with local and national organizations that share its key objectives.

Current and past projects

The Rainforest Foundation UK is currently funding and collaborating on work in 7 countries: Cameroon, Central African Republic, Democratic Republic of Congo, Gabon, Ghana, Peru and Republic of Congo. The Foundation's current projects and campaigns include:

Mapping For Rights
Community-based real-time monitoring
Sustainable livelihoods
Community-based forest management
Land use planning

Campaigns

Sustainable Conservation
The Rainforest Foundation UK has called upon national governments to review their current protected area policies, assessing their conservation effectiveness and revising practices so that community rights are integrated into all aspects of conservation and planning. The Foundation has also called upon international NGOs, aid agencies and conservation organizations to revise their conservation strategies with a more participatory and rights-based focus.

Palm oil
RFUK has been critical of large-scale palm oil development in the Congo Basin, citing concerns over environmental damage and the displacement of local communities. In 2013, the charity, in collaboration with Ethical Consumer, produced a 'palm oil guide' for British consumers, which listed several brands available in the UK market with scores for each. The guide was discontinued in 2017.

Logging
The Foundation has been a vocal supporter of a moratorium on new logging concessions in the Democratic Republic of the Congo, which has been in place since 2002. The organisation has campaigned alongside other environmental and human rights charities to preserve the moratorium.

Climate change and REDD
The Foundation has been a major critic of carbon offsetting schemes such as REDD, citing issues such as a lack of effectiveness and negative impacts on forest-dependent communities.

Funding
The Rainforest Foundation UK is a non-profit organization. The majority of its financing comes from foundation grants, development agencies (e.g. DfID, GIZ) and other non-profit organizations, the Rainforest Fund among them, as well as from individual donations.

The independent charity rating website Alive And Giving gave the Rainforest Foundation UK an efficiency score of 90%, based on 2012 data from the Charity Commission for England and Wales.
According to its own 2016/17 Annual Report and 2016 data from the UK Charity Commission, 95% of the Rainforest Foundation UK's expenditures go to charitable activities, with the remainder spent on governance costs, administration and fundraising.

Collaboration

INGOs
The Rainforest Foundation UK has worked on joint projects and campaigns with several other international non-governmental organisations (INGOs), including:
Forest Peoples Programme
Survival International
Well Grounded
Ethical Consumer
IIED
Fern
Client Earth

National NGOs
The Rainforest Foundation UK works in partnership with several human rights and environmental organisations in Africa and South America, including:

Cameroon
AJESH (Ajemalibu Self Help)
APED (Appui pour la Protection de l’Environnement et le Développement)
APIFED (Appui à l’autopromotion et l’insertion des femmes, des jeunes et des désœuvrés)
CED (Centre pour l’Environnement et le Développement)
FODER (Forêts et Développement Rural)

Central African Republic
MEFP (Maison de l’Enfant et de la Femme Pygmées)

Democratic Republic of Congo 
CADEM (Centre d’accompagnement de la population pour le développement de Maï Ndombe)
CAGDFT (Centre D’Appui à la Gestion Durable des Fôrets Tropicales)
GASHE (Groupe d’action pour sauver l’homme et son environnement)
RRN (Réseau Ressources Naturelles)

Gabon
BRAINFOREST

Ghana
Friends of the Earth Ghana
Civic Response

Peru
CARE (Central Ashaninka del Rio Ene)
FENAMAD (Federación Nativa del Río Madre de Dios y Afluentes)
AIDESEP (Asociación Interétnica de Desarrollo de la Selva Peruana)

Republic of Congo
FGDH (Forum for the Governance of Human Rights)
OCDH (Congolese Human Rights Observatory)

Corporate alliances and promotions
The Rainforest Foundation UK does not participate in product certification schemes. However, it has previously partnered with companies and social enterprises for its fundraising. Current and past alliances include:
 Betty's and Taylor's Group Ltd
Caffe Musetti
Triodos Bank
Ecotricity
Loving Earth

Publications 
Rainforest Foundation UK produces a quarterly newsletter and publishes news updates on its website, as well as producing an annual report on its work. The organization also publishes reports, research and policy briefs on issues related to its work.

References

External links
Rainforest Foundation UK

Human rights organisations based in London
International environmental organizations